Lychee Bay or Litchi Bay, a set of creeks and lakes that flow southwest to Pearl River, is a tourist attraction in Guangzhou (Canton), Guangdong. Liwan District, where Lychee Bay is located, was named after it. There are many historical relics and historical architectures in Lychee Bay, such as Wenta and Xiguan House. Various cultural activities are held on Lychee Bay, such as the Cantonese opera competition.

Geography
Lychee Bay is located in Xiguan, Liwan District, Guangzhou. In the past, it usually referred to a large area from Sima Creek to Wongsha. It is a drainage system composed of several creeks, including Xiguan and Liwan Creeks, flowing into the Pearl River. This is called the old Lychee Bay now. In a modern context, Lychee Bay usually refers to the segment of Xiguan Creek from Puntong to the Pearl River, which is part of the old Lychee Bay.

History

Origin of Lychee Bay
Lychee Bay's history dates back to 2,200 years ago. In 206 BC, the Han emperor asked his subordinate Lü Jia to come to Guangzhou in order to surrender. After he did so, Lu Jia settled in Xicun, a small village in Guangzhou. He planted vegetables and flowers. Gradually, people started to call this place "Lychee Bay".

Rise of Lychee Bay
During the Tang dynasty, people started to build the famous "Liyuan" (荔園) garden. During the Nanhan dynasty, there were many gardens, such as "Fanghuayuan" (芳華苑), "Hualinyuan" (華林園), and "Changhuayuan" (昌華苑). These became imperial gardens. During the Yuan dynasty, there were also lemon gardens. At the time of the Ming dynasty, Lychee Bay became a tourist attraction for ordinary people. Besides, it became one of the eight most famous attractions in Guangzhou. Its fame increased during the Qing dynasty.

Decay of Lychee Bay
In the 1940s, Lychee Bay became inhabited by vegetable growers and poor people due to the rapid development and urbanization in Guangzhou city. In order to expand the city area and build more houses, the citizens cut the trees down. At the same time, Xicun became the industrial base of Guangzhou city. The river became polluted and the water quality became increasingly worse.

Disappearance of Lychee Bay
In the 1950s, there were still water channels, but every branch of these water channels was filled with earth. With the establishment of factories in Guangzhou, the water system of Lychee Bay had become a cesspool. In the 1980s, more and more water channels were filled. In 1992, the last water channel—from Punkai Restaurant (泮溪酒家) to Fungyuen Bridge (逢源橋) — was filled. Lychee Bay disappeared.

Reappearance of Lychee Bay
In 1999, the Chinese People's Political Consultative Conference raised a proposal about rebuilding Lychee Bay. In 2009, this proposal was finally put into effect because of the Asian Games. On 16 October 2010, water was imported into the river, and Lychee Bay was born anew.

Tourist attractions

Leung Ancestral Hall
Leung Ancestral Hall (梁家祠) is a building situated on 34 Liangjiaci Street. It is intended to convey a style reminiscent of the Lingnan region of China.

Saikwan Mansion
Saikwan Mansion (西关大屋) represents the traditional culture of Guangzhou. This building first appeared during the Qing dynasty and was used by rich and powerful people.

Renwei Temple
Located in Longjing Road West, Guangzhou, Renwei Temple (仁威庙) is about 2,200 square meters in size. The temple is used to worship Emperor Zhenwu (真武帝) as well as by Taoists. Renwei Temple was built in 1052. It is famous for its decorations, such as wood, stone, and brick carvings.

Wenta
Wen Tower, also called Wenbita or  Wenchangta, is located in Lychee Bay. It is uncertain when it was built. However, according to its architectural style, it dates from the Qing dynasty. Wenta is a 2-story brick/wood structure which stands at 13 meters high.

Cruise ships
Electric cruise ships are available for people to visit Lychee Bay.

Food
Lychee Bay offers many types of traditional Guangzhou cuisine.

Beef offal
Beef offal, which comes in many flavors, is famous in Guangzhou. The dish includes radishes and Chinese herbs. In Guangzhou, it is usually salty and spicy. In Lychee Bay, many people would cup a bowl of beef offal.

Water chestnut cake
Water chestnut cake is one of the traditional desserts in Guangdong province and southern Fujian.  There are many kinds of water chestnut cake, such as coconut-water chestnut cake and hawthorn-water chestnut cake.

Pickled radish
Pickle radish, which tastes sweet and sour, is a typical dish of the region.

References

External links
 Lychee Bay information in Chinese

Bays of China